Gisela Verónica Vega (born 14 March 1982) is an Argentine professional basketball player who plays as a power forward and a center.

Vega has played in Europe since 2001, primarily in Spain (on both the Liga Femenina de Baloncesto and the second tier Liga Femenina 2 de Baloncesto), and has also been part of the French squad Tarbes Gespe Bigorre. She has also been on the Argentina women's national basketball team since 2002, competing in the World Championship along with Americas Championships, South American Championships, and Pan American Games.

Vega's brother, Sebastián Vega, is also a professional basketball player.

References

External links
 Profile at eurobasket.com

1982 births
Living people
Sportspeople from Entre Ríos Province
Argentine women's basketball players
Power forwards (basketball)
Centers (basketball)
Tarbes Gespe Bigorre players
Basketball players at the 2015 Pan American Games
Pan American Games competitors for Argentina
Argentine expatriate basketball people in Mozambique
Argentine expatriate basketball people in France
Argentine emigrants to Spain
Naturalised citizens of Spain
Argentine expatriate basketball people in Spain